Antonio "Toni" García Montero (born 7 August 1991), is a Spanish footballer who plays as a left back for Linares Deportivo.

Club career
Born in Écija, Province of Seville, Toni graduated from Real Valladolid's youth system, making his senior debuts with the reserves in the 2010–11 season, in Tercera División. On 9 November 2010 he played his first official game with the first team, featuring 32 minutes in a 1–1 away draw against RCD Espanyol for the campaign's Copa del Rey.

On 6 July 2012 Toni signed with another reserve team, Getafe CF B in Segunda División B. now, in the 2016/2017 he plays in the Italian Lega pro with Taranto club.

On season 2018/19 signed for Puente Genil FC from Europa F.C. of Gibraltar Premier Division.
On the Transfer window 2019 he signed for CD Izarra in Segunda División B.

References

External links
 
 Futbolme profile
 

1991 births
Living people
People from Écija
Sportspeople from the Province of Seville
Spanish footballers
Footballers from Andalusia
Association football defenders
Segunda División B players
Tercera División players
Real Valladolid Promesas players
Getafe CF B players
CD Izarra footballers
Linares Deportivo footballers
Slovak Super Liga players
MFK Zemplín Michalovce players
Gibraltar Premier Division players
Europa F.C. players
Serie C players
Taranto F.C. 1927 players
Spanish expatriate footballers
Expatriate footballers in Slovakia
Expatriate footballers in Gibraltar
Expatriate footballers in Italy
Spanish expatriate sportspeople in Slovakia
Spanish expatriate sportspeople in Gibraltar
Spanish expatriate sportspeople in Italy